London City Airways was a British airline which was founded in 1986 by British Midland to operate from London City Airport.

History
The company was incorporated in 1986 as Eurocity Express. Operations began in the summer of 1987 from its base at London City Airport to Amsterdam, Brussels and Paris using two de Havilland Canada Dash 7. Together with Brymon Airways, with whom it competed directly on the Paris route, the airline was responsible for launching operations from the newly constructed airport. A summer schedule to Jersey and weekend ad hoc charters were added later.

In 1988, the airline was renamed as London City Airways so as to identify more closely with its base. Orders were placed for three de Havilland Canada Dash 7, the final airframes of this type that were produced. They took up the recently released British Airways unused Concorde registrations G-BOAW, AX and AY. The two original aircraft were sold when the third aircraft arrived, but later in 1988, a further Dash 7 G-BOAZ was purchased from Maersk Air to increase the fleet to four aircraft.

The airline was closed in 1990 following sustained financial losses. The aircraft were transferred to the parent British Midland Airways.

Fleet
London City Airways operated only one aircraft type:
  de Havilland Canada Dash 7

See also
 List of defunct airlines of the United Kingdom

External links

Airlines Remembered: London City Airways
London City Airways Tribute

Defunct airlines of the United Kingdom
Airlines established in 1988
Airlines disestablished in 1990